Avianca Costa Rica serves the following destinations:

See also
List of Avianca destinations

References

Avianca
Lists of airline destinations